The warm-chevroned moth (Tortricidia testacea) is a moth of the family Limacodidae. It is found from Nova Scotia west and south to Manitoba, Missouri and Mississippi. There is also a record from South Carolina.

The wingspan is 15–26 mm. Adults are on wing from April to August.

The larvae feed on beech, birch, black cherry, chestnut, oak and witch-hazel.

See also 
 Tortricidia pallida (Herrich-Schäffer, 1854)
 Tortricidia flexuosa (Grote, 1880)
 Tortricidia

References

External links
Bug Guide

Limacodidae
Moths of North America
Moths described in 1864
Taxa named by Alpheus Spring Packard